Events in the year 2021 in Saint Vincent and the Grenadines.

Incumbents
Monarch: Elizabeth II
Governor General: Susan Dougan 
Prime Minister: Ralph Gonsalves

Events

Ongoing — COVID-19 pandemic in Saint Vincent and the Grenadines

9 April – An explosive eruption of the volcano La Soufrière is forcing the evacuation of thousands of people.

Deaths
21 May – Dwayne Sandy, footballer (born 1989).

References

 
2020s in Saint Vincent and the Grenadines
Years of the 21st century in Saint Vincent and the Grenadines
Saint Vincent and the Grenadines
Saint Vincent and the Grenadines